Avricourt is a commune in the Meurthe-et-Moselle department in northeastern France.

Avricourt, Meurthe-et-Moselle is adjacent to Avricourt, Moselle with which it formed a single entity until a revision of the Treaty of Frankfurt in 1871.

Population

See also
 Avricourt, Moselle
 Communes of the Meurthe-et-Moselle department

References

Communes of Meurthe-et-Moselle